Council Wars was a racially polarized political war in the city of Chicago from 1983 to 1986.

Council Wars may also refer to:

 Dark Colony: The Council Wars, an expansion pack to the 1997 video game, Dark Colony
 The Council Wars, an in-progress book series by John Ringo